Richie Grant (born November 9, 1997) is an American football safety for the Atlanta Falcons of the National Football League (NFL). He played college football at UCF, and was drafted by the Falcons in the second round of the 2021 NFL Draft.

Early life and high school
Grant was born and lived in Lumberton, Mississippi, until moving to Fort Walton Beach, Florida, when he was nine years old. He attended Choctawhatchee High School, where he ran track and played defensive back and wide receiver on the football team. Grant was rated a two star recruit by 247Sports and committed to play college football at Central Florida over offers from Georgia State, Tennessee-Chattanooga, the Citadel and Kennesaw State.

College career
Grant redshirted his true freshman season and was in the defensive backfield rotation as a redshirt freshman. Grant was named a starter going into his redshirt sophomore season and was named first team All-American Athletic Conference (AAC) after leading the Knights with 109 tackles and six interceptions along with three forced fumbles and nine passes defended. He was again named first team all-conference after recording four tackles for loss, eight passes defended, one forced fumble and an interception the following season. As a redshirt senior, Grant was named first team All-AAC for a third straight season after leading the team with 72 tackles along with 3.5 tackles for a loss, three interceptions, six pass break-ups, two forced fumbles and two fumble recoveries. As a senior, he was a Jim Thorpe Award finalist and Bednarik Award semifinalist.

Professional career
Grant was selected in the second round with the 40th overall pick of the 2021 NFL Draft by the Atlanta Falcons. He signed his four-year rookie contract with Atlanta on June 18, worth $8.3 million and a $3.4 million signing bonus.

Personal life
Grant's uncle, Terry Grant, played running back at the University of Alabama and for the Hamilton Tiger-Cats of the Canadian Football League. At UCF, he studied sports and exercise science. As a freshman, he earned American All-Academic Team honors (2016-17).

References

External links
UCF Knights bio

1997 births
Living people
People from Fort Walton Beach, Florida
Players of American football from Florida
American football safeties
UCF Knights football players
Atlanta Falcons players
People from Lumberton, Mississippi